Associazione Sportiva Dilettantistica Cascina is an Italian association football club located in Cascina, Tuscany. It currently plays in Serie D.

History
The club was founded in 1924 as Associazione Sportiva Dilettantistica Cascina Calcio.

It has played in Serie D in the 1998–99 season and from 2001–02 to 2007–08 season.

In the summer of 2013, Cascina was merged with Valdera Calcio Associazione Sportiva Dilettantistica and was renamed as Cascina Valdera. The club was excluded in 2016 and refounded as A.S.D. Cascina, starting from Promozione. They were promoted subsequently to Eccellenza in 2019, and back to Serie D in 2021. In the 2021–22 Serie D season, Cascina escaped relegation thanks to good performances in the second half of the season.

Colors and badge
Its colors are black and blue.

References

External links
 Official homepage

Association football clubs established in 1924
Football clubs in Tuscany
1924 establishments in Italy